The Naked Brothers Band is an American musical comedy television series created and showran by Polly Draper, which aired on Nickelodeon from February 3, 2007, to June 13, 2009. It depicts the daily lives of Draper's sons, who lead a faux world-renowned children's rock band in New York City. As a mockumentary, the storyline is an embellished satire of their real lives, and the fictional presence of a camera is often acknowledged. The show stars Nat Wolff and Alex Wolff, the lead singer-songwriter, and drummer, respectively. Nat's fictional female interest Rosalina (Allie DiMeco) and real-life friends Thomas Batuello, David Levi, and Cooper Pillot, as well as Qaasim Middleton—who has no prior acquaintance with the family—feature as the other band members, with Draper's jazz musician husband Michael Wolff as his sons' widowed accordion-playing dad, and her niece Jesse Draper portraying the group's babysitter.

The series is a spinoff of Draper's film of the same name that was picked up by the network, premiering in January 2007. When the show debuted on the channel, it aired two episodes, garnering 3.7 million viewers. Viacom announced, the "series delivered Nickelodeon's highest-rated premiere in seven years" and it became favorable for children aged 6–11. The show concluded after three seasons because the network began placing high shooting demands on the family that would disrupt the siblings' schooling.

Series overview

Episodes

Pilot

Season 1 (2007)

Season 2 (2008)

Season 3 (2008–09)

TV Specials

References

External links
TV Guide's Naked Brothers Band episode list

Lists of American children's television series episodes

Lists of Nickelodeon television series episodes
Lists of American sitcom episodes